The  is a line of the Japanese Minamoto clan that is descended from Emperor Seiwa, which is the most successful and powerful line of the clan. Many of the most famous Minamoto warriors, including Minamoto no Yoshiie, Minamoto no Yoritomo, the founder of the Kamakura shogunate; and Ashikaga Takauji, the founder of the Ashikaga shogunate, belonged to this line. Tokugawa Ieyasu (1543–1616), founder of the Tokugawa shogunate, also claimed descent from this lineage. The family is named after Emperor Seiwa, whose four sons and twelve grandsons founded the Seiwa Genji. Emperor Seiwa was father of Imperial Prince Sadazumi (貞純親王 Sadazumi Shinnō) (873–916), who was in turn the father of Minamoto no Tsunemoto (源経基) (894–961), one of the founders of the Seiwa Genji, from whom most Seiwa Genji members are descended. Many samurai families belong to this line and used "Minamoto" clan name in official records, including the Ashikaga clan, Hatakeyama clan, Hosokawa clan, Imagawa clan, Mori, Nanbu clan, Nitta clan, Ogasawara clan, Ōta clan, Satake clan, Satomi clan, Shiba clan, Takeda clan, Toki clan, Tsuchiya clan, among others.  The Shimazu clan and Tokugawa clan also claimed to belong to this line.

A group of Shinto shrines connected closely with the clan is known as the Three Genji Shrines (源氏三神社 Genji San Jinja).

Family tree
The following family trees are a non-exhaustive listing of the Seiwa Genji and the clans that branched from the family.

Legend: Solid lines represent blood relationship; dashed lines represent adoptions. An asterisk indicates a monk (who would not have been allowed to retain the Minamoto name).

Emperor Seiwa's first five princes

Prince Sadazumi's descendants

Emperor Seiwa's other princes

Settsu Genji

Yamato Genji

Kawachi Genji

Yoshimitsu's descendants

Mitsumasa's descendants

Mitsuyoshi's descendants

See also
 Sakai clan

Notes

References
Sansom, George (1958). A History of Japan to 1334. Stanford, California: Stanford University Press.
Turnbull, Stephen (1998). The Samurai Sourcebook. London: Cassell & Co.

Minamoto clan